This is a list of civil parishes in the ceremonial county of Hertfordshire, England. There are 128 civil parishes.

List of civil parishes and unparished areas

See also
 List of civil parishes in England
 List of settlements in Hertfordshire by population
 The Hundred Parishes, a grouping of parishes in East and North Herts, NW Essex and southern Cambridgeshire

References

External links
 Office for National Statistics : Geographical Area Listings

Civil parishes
Hertfordshire